Ryan Peniston (born 10 November 1995) is a British tennis player from Essex. He has a career-high singles ranking of world no. 123, achieved in July 2022, and a doubles ranking of world no. 384 achieved in June 2022.

Personal life
Ryan Harold Peniston was born in November 1995 to Paul and Penny (née Gok). He has two older brothers, Sam and Harry. 

As a child Peniston survived rhabdomyosarcoma, a soft tissue cancer, and had to have surgery to remove a tumour and chemotherapy. Cancer slowed his growth, and he was much smaller than his classmates until he was 16 years old. At 13, he moved to Nice, France to train at ISP Academy before going to college at 18.

A graduate of the University of Memphis tennis program, he was part of the GB University Team that won the nation's first ever team gold medal at Master’U Championships.

Professional career

2020: Battle of the Brits
During the COVID-19 pandemic in 2020, Peniston took part in the 'Battle of the Brits' tournament and performed well, losing only on final set tie-breaks against top-50 players Dan Evans and Cameron Norrie.

2021: ATP doubles debut 
Peniston won the Heraklion leg of the  2021 ITF Men's World Tennis Tour (April–June) on 30 May 2021, conceding only three games to Yuta Shimizu in winning the final in straight sets and only dropping one set in the whole tournament.

He was given a wildcard into the singles and doubles main draws of the 2021 Nottingham Open. He then received a wildcard for the 2021 Queen's Club Championships doubles main draw, playing alongside Liam Broady, and the qualifying draw in the singles. In the doubles first round, Peniston and Broady defeated Alexander Bublik and Nicholas Monroe in straight sets. In the singles qualifying, Peniston defeated Marc-Andrea Hüsler before losing to Aleksandar Vukic in 3 sets.

2022: ATP debut, first top-5 win & quarterfinal, top 150 debut and progressing to the 2nd round of Wimbledon
Peniston made his ATP main draw singles debut at the Queen's Club Championships as a wildcard, where he upset top seed and world no. 5 Casper Ruud in straight sets for his first ever ATP Win. He reached the quarterfinals in his first ever ATP tour level tournament for the first time defeating another top-50 player Francisco Cerundolo. As a result he made his debut in the top 150 in the singles rankings.

At the 2022 Eastbourne International he reached the second round as a wildcard defeating 8th seed Holger Rune. Next he defeated Pedro Martinez before losing to compatriot Jack Draper in the quarterfinals.

Penniston then defeated Henri Laaksonen in straight-sets in the first round of Wimbledon.

Singles performance timeline

Current through the 2022 Korea Open.

ATP Challenger and ITF Futures finals

Singles: 12 (4–8)

Doubles: 5 (1–4)

Record against top 10 players

Wins over top 10 players
He has a  record against players who were, at the time the match was played, ranked in the top 10.

References

External links

Lawn Tennis Association profile

1995 births
Living people
British male tennis players
British people of Malaysian descent
English male tennis players
Tennis people from Essex
Memphis Tigers men's tennis players